Brentford railway station opened on 1 May 1860 on the Brentford Branch Line (the only line of the Great Western and Brentford Railway Company) which had opened in 1859 from  to Brentford Dock. It stood immediately north of Brentford High Street (the A315 road) on the embankment leading to the viaduct into the dock. The station closed on 22 March 1915 as a wartime economy measure, re-opened on 12 April 1920 and closed permanently on 4 May 1942. The station was demolished in 1957.

Proposed reopening
In April 2017, it was proposed that the line could reopen to allow a new link from Southall to Hounslow and possibly down to the planned Old Oak Common station with a new station in Brentford called Brentford Golden Mile. The proposal suggested the service could be operated by Great Western Railway and could be open by 2020 with a new service from Southall to Brentford and possible later to Old Oak Common. It was likely that the site would be further up from the original and would have a later extension to the existing Brentford station.

Notes

References

 

Buildings and structures demolished in 1957
Former Great Western Railway stations
Railway stations in Great Britain opened in 1860
Railway stations in Great Britain closed in 1915
Railway stations in Great Britain opened in 1920
Railway stations in Great Britain closed in 1942
Disused railway stations in the London Borough of Hounslow